Schwand may refer to:

 Schwand (Engelberg), a settlement in the municipality of Engelberg in the Swiss canton of Obwalden
 Schwand, a district in the municipality of Schwanstetten, Germany
 Schwand im Innkreis, a municipality in the district Braunau am Inn in Upper Austria, Austria

See also 
 Schwandt